Deborah Anne Mazar Corcos (born August 13, 1964) is an American actress and television personality who plays sharp-tongued women. She began her career with supporting roles in Goodfellas (1990), Little Man Tate (1991) and Singles (1992), followed by lead roles on the legal drama series Civil Wars and L.A. Law. She portrayed press agent Shauna Roberts on the HBO series Entourage. She also starred as Maggie Amato on TV Land's longest running original series, Younger, and alongside her husband Gabriele Corcos in the Cooking Channel series Extra Virgin.

Mazar has had a long term friendship with Madonna.

Early life 
Mazar was born in Jamaica, Queens, New York City, the daughter of Nancy and Harry Mazar (Harija Fogelmanis). Her father was born in German-occupied Latvia to a Jewish family. She had no knowledge of her father's ancestry until her twenties as he practiced Catholicism. Mazar's parents annulled their marriage shortly after she was born, and she spent her early life in the country in upstate New York with her mother. As a teenager, she relocated to Long Island, where she lived with her godparents.

Mazar worked various odd jobs, including selling jewelry at Fiorucci with Linda Ramone and Joey Arias, later as a dental assistant, and at a nightclub.

Career 
While working at Danceteria, Mazar met Madonna, who hired Mazar to do her makeup for the music video for "Everybody".  Mazar also originated the hair and makeup for the play Speed-the-Plow.

Mazar began her career as a hip hop b-girl in New York City. Her first television appearance was on the pilot for a hip hop television dance show, Graffiti Rock in 1984. She appeared in five of Madonna's music videos – "Papa Don't Preach", "True Blue" (both 1986), "Justify My Love" (1990), "Deeper and Deeper" (1992) and "Music" (2000).

Mazar has played a number of minor supporting roles in a variety of films, including Sandy, a friend of Henry Hill's mistress in Goodfellas (1990); The Doors (1991); a small role in Spike Lee's Malcolm X (1992); Bullets Over Broadway (1994); and as Spice (of Sugar and Spice, with Drew Barrymore as Sugar) in Batman Forever (1995). She gained her first real following from playing a character on Civil Wars in the early 1990s. When that series was cancelled her character was brought over as a recurring role between the 1993 and 1994 seasons of the TV drama L.A. Law.

She played the villain Regina, a modern-day Cruella de Vil, in the family film Beethoven's 2nd (1993). She has appeared in independent films Inside Monkey Zetterland and Nowhere and her short-lived sitcom, Temporarily Yours. She appeared as the genie in the Space Monkeys' music video, "Sugarcane".

Mazar appeared on a Friends episode in its eighth season ("The One Where Rachel Has a Baby, Part One"). Mazar played "Doreen, the Evil Bitch," a crazed pregnant woman who shares a hospital room with Rachel. In the 1999 docudrama film The Insider she played character Lowell Bergman's assistant Debi. From 2000-02 she played Jackie on the television drama That's Life. She provided the voice of Maria Latore in the video games Grand Theft Auto III (2001) and Grand Theft Auto: San Andreas (2004). Also in 2004, she made a cameo appearance in the movie Collateral in which she played the passenger while arguing with her boyfriend (Bodhi Elfman) while the movie's main protagonist, Max Durocher (Jamie Foxx), is driving them to their destination.

From 2004 to 2011, she had a supporting role on Entourage as press agent Shauna Roberts. She also had a recurring role on the sitcom Living with Fran, as  Merrill, the cousin of Fran Drescher's character. She did a two-episode stint on the television series Ugly Betty as fraudster Leah Stillman.

Mazar was a contestant on the ninth season of Dancing With the Stars. She was partnered with Maksim Chmerkovskiy and finished in twelfth place, eliminated in the third week (October 6, 2009). In 2012, Mazar played Jessica, a glamorous, leather-clad villainess in Home Alone: The Holiday Heist.

Mazar began appearing on the Cooking Channel cooking/reality show television series Extra Virgin in January 2011. She, her husband Gabriele Corcos and their two daughters starred in the series, which depicted their lives and showcased their own recipes. The show was scripted and lasted five seasons. In 2015, Mazar and her husband started another series on the Cooking Channel entitled Extra Virgin Americana where they travel the U.S., road trip style, with their children and family friend searching for great food.

From 2015 to 2021, Mazar starred in Younger with Sutton Foster and Hilary Duff as Maggie Amato. The series met critical acclaim and was renewed for a seventh season in 2019, making it the longest running original series in the "TV Land" network's history.

Mazar appeared in the second season of The $100,000 Pyramid reboot on ABC on August 6, 2017. In the main game, she helped her contestant get 7 clues in only 15 seconds causing host Michael Strahan to say, "I think that's the quickest round we've ever had, 15 seconds!"

In 2018 she played Ava Gardner in the Spanish period comedy-drama television series Arde Madrid,  telling the story of the period which the American actress spent in Madrid during Francoist Spain.

Personal life 
Prior to her marriage, Mazar dated actor Paul Reubens for several years beginning in 1993. Reubens has since credited Mazar with ending his depression resulting from his 1991 arrest.

She married Gabriele Corcos on March 16, 2002, in a ceremony officiated by Ellen Burstyn. They have two daughters, Giulia and Evelina. , the family divided their time between Brooklyn and a 15th-century home outside of Florence, Italy, that was given to them as a wedding present by Mazar's in-laws. 

Mazar and Corcos formerly hosted an internet show focused on Tuscan cuisine, Under The Tuscan Gun. The family formerly lived in Los Angeles but moved to Brooklyn, New York in 2009. On January 19, 2011, Mazar and her husband Gabriele began hosting the cooking show Extra Virgin on the Cooking Channel, and released a cookbook, Recipes & Love From Our Tuscan Kitchen, in 2014.

Mazar and her husband both appeared on an episode of the ABC talk show The Chew in 2014 to promote their show, Extra Virgin. Between 2020-2021 the couple ran a cafe/restaurant called Tuscan Gun in the Windsor Terrace neighborhood of Brooklyn. Prior to the Covid-19 pandemic Mazar and her family relocated to their Florence villa.

Filmography

Film

Television

Video games

Music videos 
 1986 Madonna: "Papa Don't Preach"
 1986 Madonna: "True Blue"
 1990 Madonna: "Justify My Love"
 1992 Madonna: "Deeper and Deeper"
 2000 Madonna: "Music"

References

External links 

1964 births
Living people
20th-century American actresses
21st-century American actresses
Actresses from New York City
American expatriates in Italy
American film actresses
American people of Latvian-Jewish descent
American people of Latvian descent
American television actresses
American voice actresses
American video game actresses
Participants in American reality television series
People from Long Island
People from Jamaica, Queens